Xaisi or Ban Xaisi is a river village in Attopu Province, in southern Laos. It is located just east of the provincial capital of Attopu, not far west of Xaysetha.

References

External links
Maplandia World Gazetteer

Populated places in Attapeu province